The 2016 Colombo Sevens was the third and final leg of the Asian Sevens Series for the year. The tournament was held between 15 and 16 October 2016 at the Colombo International Rugby Stadium.

Hong Kong had their third straight tournament win in the series, defeating South Korea 24-19 in the Cup final. The victory secured Hong Kong the overall series title and a place in the international qualifier for the 2017 Hong Kong Sevens, which is part of the World Rugby Sevens Series. China defeated Sri Lanka 22-21 in the third/fourth place playoff however the home side secured enough overall points in the series to finish second and also secure a place in the international qualifier at the 2017 Hong Kong Sevens. In the plate final Malaysia defeated Japan 19-14. The leading points scorer for the tournament was Benjamin Rimene from Hong Kong with 39 points (comprising three tries and twelve conversions) closely followed by Malaysia's Azwan Mat Zizi on 38 points (four tries and 9 conversions). The top try scorer was Richard Dharmapala from Sri Lanka with six tries.

Pool Stage

Pool A

Pool B

Finals

Plate

Cup

Standings

2016
2016 Asian Seven Series
2016 rugby sevens competitions
2016 in Asian rugby union
rugby sevens